Sorin Ioan Paraschiv (born 17 June 1981) is a Romanian former professional footballer who played as a midfielder.

Club career

Steaua București (1999–2007)
After being a member of the Steaua Youth Academy, where Paraschiv started to play football in 1992, aged 11, in 1999, aged 18, he signed his first professional contract with Steaua.

He made his first appearance in Divizia A in 2000, when he was only 19 years old, in a match versus FC Extensiv Craiova won by his team with 3–0.

Even though he only played only 1 game in his first season, Steaua won the championship title that year. Starting from the season 2001–2002 Paraschiv became an essential player for Steaua and because of his performances constantly good he became the vice-captain of the team after Steaua's main leader Mirel Rădoi.

After 3 seasons in which Steaua finished on the second place, Paraschiv and his teammates succeeded to win the champion title in 2 consecutive seasons (2004–2005, 2005–2006).

Even though he only scored eleven times in 139 games Paraschiv has an important place in the coordination of Steaua's play.
Sorin Paraschiv played 34 games and he scored three times in the European cups. He debuted in the season 2002–2003 in the qualifiers for UEFA Champions League when Steaua was eliminated by Dynamo Kiev.

He played in 2 other seasons in UEFA Cup but his climbing in the European Cups started in the season 2004–2005 in UEFA Cup. Although Steaua defeated teams like Valencia, the ex-winner of UEFA Cup, Beşiktaş Istanbul and Standard Liège was eliminated in 1/8 finals by Villareal.

Next season after they were eliminated from UEFA Champions League qualifiers by Rosenborg, Steaua played in UEFA Cup and reached the semifinal phase. They had important victories against Lens, SC Heerenveen, Real Betis and against their rivals from the internal competition, Rapid București in the quarter final. They were stopped in the semifinal after two dramatic games by Middlesbrough.

In the season 2006–2007 they succeeded to qualify in UEFA Champions League in a group with Real Madrid, Olympique Lyonnais and Dynamo Kiev after they defeated Standard Liège in the qualifiers.

He played at Steaua until 2007, winning three Romanian championships (2000–01, 2004–05, 2005–06) and two Romanian Super Cups.

Rimini Calcio F.C. (2007–2009)
On 4 July 2007 Italian Serie B club Rimini officially announced to have signed him. Paraschiv's contract with Rimini is due to expire in June 2011.

Unirea Urziceni (2009–2010)
On 30 June 2009 he left Italy and returned to his homeland to sign with Unirea Urziceni.

International career
For the national team Sorin Paraschiv debuted in 2004 in a game against Andorra, which ended with the Romanians victory (5-1). He also played in another 3 games against Armenia, Ivory Coast and Nigeria but did not score anytime.

International stats

Honours
Steaua București
Divizia A: 2000–01, 2004–05, 2005–06
Supercupa României: 2001, 2006

Unirea Urziceni
Supercupa României runner-up: 2009, 2010

References

External links
 
 
 
 

1981 births
Living people
People from Alexandria, Romania
Romanian footballers
Association football midfielders
Romania under-21 international footballers
Romania international footballers
Romania youth international footballers
Romanian expatriate footballers
Expatriate footballers in Italy
Expatriate footballers in Ukraine
Romanian expatriate sportspeople in Italy
Romanian expatriate sportspeople in Ukraine
FC Steaua București players
FC Unirea Urziceni players
Rimini F.C. 1912 players
FC Volyn Lutsk players
FCV Farul Constanța players
CS Concordia Chiajna players
Liga I players
Liga II players
Serie B players
Ukrainian Premier League players